The Tainan Children's Science Museum (TCSM) is a museum in North District, Tainan, Taiwan.

Architecture
The museum is housed in a four-story building, which houses the audiovisual room, administration center, exhibition rooms, reading room, kids playroom and classrooms.

Transportation
The museum is accessible within walking distance north of Tainan Station of Taiwan Railways.

See also
 List of museums in Taiwan

References

External links

 

Children's museums in Taiwan
Museums in Tainan